Ordeal by Innocence is a Three-part BBC drama that was first broadcast during April 2018. It is based on the Agatha Christie novel of the same name and is the third English-language filmed version to be broadcast. The drama stars Morven Christie, Bill Nighy, Anna Chancellor, Alice Eve and Eleanor Tomlinson amongst others.

The show was originally intended to be broadcast as part of the BBC Christmas programming but was held back due to original cast member Ed Westwick being accused of sexual assault. His scenes were later reshot with Christian Cooke taking his place.

The series attracted positive reviews despite some backlash over the changes made to the plot. The direction and styling were afforded particular praise.
The series was released on DVD through Universal Pictures UK on 11 March 2019.

Synopsis
Wealthy heiress Rachel Argyll is found bludgeoned to death in her palatial home where she lives with her husband, Leo; their five adopted children Mary, Mickey, Jack, Tina, and Hester; and their maid, Kirsten Lindquist. Jack is arrested for the crime as his fingerprints are found on the presumed murder weapon, but is killed in jail before he can stand trial.

Eighteen months later, Leo is set to marry his secretary Gwenda Vaughn, much to his children's dismay. A man named Arthur Calgary arrives and provides an alibi for Jack: he had given him a lift at the time of the murder. Calgary claims to have been working in the Arctic since the murder and only just learned about it. Leo believes him to be a charlatan and Mickey threatens him. Calgary is later approached by Mary's husband, Philip Durrant, who has become embittered towards the Argylls after being paralyzed in a car crash and suggests they work together to extort money from the family. Calgary rejects his offer but promises to clear Jack's name. Flashbacks reveal that Rachel was a cruel and unloving mother who alienated her children, giving all of them a motive to murder her.

As Calgary returns to the Argyll estate, a car tries to run him down. The car crashes, killing the driver, Bellamy Gould, the police detective who investigated Rachel's murder. Calgary meets Leo and admits that he had lied about his background. He was a scientist who had worked on the atomic bomb and suffered a mental breakdown from guilt. The night of the murder, Calgary escaped from a mental asylum and was recaptured after giving Jack a lift. Calgary says that he saw another car on the road that night. Durrant, having antagonized many of the family members, is confronted by the killer, who murders him via a drug overdose.

The next morning Durrant's body is discovered by Leo and Calgary. The Argyll children and Kirsten begin to piece together what happened. Flashbacks show the events leading up to the murder. Jack, in an attempt to goad his mother, had confronted her with the fact that Mickey and Tina had become lovers. In turn she revealed to him that Kirsten is his biological mother and Leo his father, which caused him to flee the house. Rachel discovered Leo having sex with Gwenda and threatened to divorce him, so he bludgeoned her to death with one of his Egyptian statuettes. Bellamy Gould helped frame Jack, out of rage at Jack's affair with his wife. To prevent Jack from revealing the truth about his parentage, Leo and Bellamy conspired to have him killed before he could stand trial.

Back in the present, Calgary is taken back to the mental hospital on Leo's recommendation. Kirsten and the children confront Leo with their knowledge of his crime. Later that day the police search for Leo, who has disappeared. Some time later the Argyll siblings visit Calgary at the mental hospital while Kirsten checks on Leo, imprisoned in the family's bomb shelter.

Differences from the novel
Ordeal by Innocence is set in the West Country of England, but this production shifted the location to Scotland, and it was filmed in and around Inverkip.

The family name in the book is Argyle, whereas it is spelt Argyll in the programme (although the pronunciation is the same). The main suspect, Jack, is called Jacko in the book, and he dies in prison from pneumonia rather than being beaten to death.

Kirsten Lindstrom, the family's housekeeper, is a middle-aged Nordic woman in the novel, a detail that plays a key role in the book's solution; in the miniseries she is depicted as a Scottish woman in her thirties and one of Rachel's foundlings. The subplot of her and Leo being the biological parents of Jack was created for the series. Dr Calgary is portrayed as mentally disturbed in this version, putting his testimony into doubt, whereas in the book his testimony is seen as reliable from the very beginning. Other characters, such as Gwenda Vaughan, Mary Durrant, and Hester Argyll, are portrayed more critically than they were in the novel: Gwenda is bossy and smug, Mary is deeply embittered, and Hester is a secret alcoholic.

The solution has also been radically altered. In the book the murderer is Kirsten, who is seduced by Jacko and instructed to kill Rachel. Jacko then intends to use Calgary to establish an alibi for himself but this backfires when the police are unable to locate Calgary.

Cast

Bill Nighy as Leo Argyll, father, Rachel's husband and engaged to Gwenda
Anthony Boyle as Jack Argyll, son and accused murderer
Anna Chancellor as Rachel Argyll, mother and murder victim
Morven Christie as Kirsten Lindstrom, housekeeper
Crystal Clarke as Tina Argyll, daughter
Christian Cooke as Mickey Argyll, son
Alice Eve as Gwenda Vaughn, former secretary engaged to Leo
Matthew Goode as Philip Durrant, Mary's husband
Ella Purnell as Hester Argyll, daughter
Eleanor Tomlinson as Mary Durrant, daughter and Philip's wife
Luke Treadaway as Doctor Arthur Calgary, Jack's potential alibi
Brian McCardie as Bellamy Gould, chief detective
Luke Murray as young Jack
Hayden Robertson as young Hester
Catriona McNicholl as young Mary
Abigail Conteh as young Tina
Rhys Lambert as young Mickey
Frances Grey as Lydia Gould, Bellamy's wife
Sammy Moore as Clive
Sandy Welch as Doctor Edwin Morsuch
Sandy Batchelor as Simon
Stuart McQuarrie as Doctor
Alexandra Finnie as young Kirsten

Changes in cast

Production
The mystery drama was adapted for the screen by Sarah Phelps who was behind the previous two Christie adaptations for the BBC over the Christmas period (And Then There Were None and The Witness for the Prosecution). Phelps acknowledged changing some elements of the story, particularly the ending, and when asked about what the purists might think, she responded "I don’t give a bollocks about people saying it has to be pure. No, it doesn’t. If you want a pure adaptation, go and get someone else to do it."

The three-parter was filmed in, and around, the town of Inverkip in the Inverclyde district west of Glasgow. Ardgowan House was used as the Argyll family home of Sunny Point.

The series was originally supposed to have been broadcast over the Christmas and New Year holidays of 2017/2018, but was cancelled due to the sexual assault allegations against Westwick. Its broadcast over the Eastertide of 2018 has split the series into three episodes across three weeks which has led to some dubbing it "ordeal by iPlayer".

Reshoots
After the drama had completed filming, the actor playing the part of Mickey Argyll (Ed Westwick) was accused of sexual assault in 2014 by two women. In the wake of other sexual assault scandals in 2017, the BBC decided to delay the broadcast pending an investigation into the allegations against Westwick.

When a third woman came forward to allege another 2014 assault by Westwick, the BBC auditioned a new actor and re-shot Westwick's part with Christian Cooke. The BBC explained that as Ridley Scott had already done something similar with All the Money in the World (replacing Kevin Spacey with Christopher Plummer), they decided to re-shoot too as, as they described it, "hundreds and hundreds of hours of people's hard earned work would have been lost". Westwick has strenuously denied the allegations and had stated that nothing had been proven.

Forty-five minutes of footage from 35 scenes was shot over 12 days with Christian Cooke. The other actors in the production were drafted in and whilst most made the time, (one production personality described them all as very busy actors), not all of them were on set together at the same time. Alice Eve, who played Gwenda Vaughn, could not make it back from America and had to be split-screened into the new footage. The actor Christian Cooke praised the production staff in getting things organised so quickly and, apart from one scene where Cooke's character has icy breath (in what was supposedly mid-summer), most critics agreed that the re-shoot went very well and that the production was "seamless".

In July 2018, the office of the Los Angeles District Attorney announced that Westwick would not be prosecuted regarding the claims of rape and sexual assault. Prosecutors said witnesses identified by the first two alleged victims were "not able to provide information that would enable the prosecution to prove either incident beyond a reasonable doubt", with prosecutors unable to contact the third claimant.

Critical reception
Lucy Mangan, writing in The Guardian, gave the first episode a maximum of five stars saying "The latest adaptation, rich, dark, adult and drawing on a backdrop of postwar grief and instability, are a far cry from the sunny – still murderous, but sunny – uplands scattered with millet seed for Joan Hickson to peck at as Miss Marple".

Michael Hogan, writing in The Sunday Telegraph, gave the episode four stars out of a possible five saying that "initially, it was ponderous and confusing, with time-hops and a wide cast of characters", but that later "the pace steadily picked up [and] by the end of the hour, this whodunit had its hooks into me". Also in The Sunday Telegraph, Ed Cumming described the series as "taut writing" but questioned the necessity for three episodes. He also noted that "everyone was so unlikeable".

The Times gave the first episode four stars out of five and noted that in spite of the production having to have 35 scenes re-shot with new actor Christian Cooke, the production was seamless. Similarly, the second episode was awarded four stars out of five. The reviewer lamented that the series had been "eked out over three weeks instead of a fortnight" but had described the episode as "rattling along rather nicely". Special mention was made of Matthew Goode who "...didn't just steal every scene he was in, he convinced us that the scene belonged to him in the first place". The third episode also garnered four stars out of five from The Times. Carol Midgley said the ending where Leo Argyll ended up being locked away in the bunker by Kirsten, "unexpected". She also said that the plot was "overboiled" and did not show whether the "Argyll children were in on it, or did they think he'd drowned?". Midgley liked it overall and said that "apart from those final shark-jumping moments, I relished every other dark, delicious thing that the writer Sarah Phelps did to the story".

The Radio Times reported that viewer feedback was positive although some had commented that the programme was confusing due to its forwards and backwards time jumps. Others criticised its soundtrack music and accused the male characters of looking too similar to each other.

References

External links
 

2010s English-language films
2010s British television miniseries
2018 British television series debuts
2018 British television series endings
2010s British drama television series
Films shot in Scotland
2010s crime thriller films
British crime films
British mystery films
English-language television shows
Television series set in the 1950s
Television shows based on works by Agatha Christie
BBC television dramas
Television series by Mammoth Screen